Italy competed at the FIS Alpine World Ski Championships 1980 in Lake Placid, United States, from 14 to 23 February 1980.

From 1948 through 1980, the alpine skiing events at the Winter Olympics also served as the World Championships, held every two years. With the addition of the giant slalom, the combined event was dropped for 1950 and 1952, but returned as a World Championship event in 1954 as a "paper race" which used the results from the three events. During the Olympics from 1956 through 1980, World Championship medals were awarded by the FIS for the combined event. The combined returned as a separate event at the World Championships in 1982 and at the Olympics in 1988.

Medalists

At this third edition of the world championships, Italy won no medal.

Results

Men

Women
In the combined ranking, being a paper race, the two Italian skiers who had taken part in all three competitions were classified.

See also
 Italy at the 1980 Winter Olympics
 Italy at the FIS Alpine World Ski Championships
 Italy national alpine ski team

References

External links
 Italian Winter Sports Federation 

Nations at the FIS Alpine World Ski Championships 1980
Alpine World Ski Championships
Italy at the FIS Alpine World Ski Championships